Brintnell is a residential neighbourhood in northeast Edmonton, Alberta, Canada. It is bounded by 167 Avenue to the north, 153 Avenue to the south, Manning Drive to the east and 50 Street to the west.

The community is represented by the Horse Hill Community League, established in 1972.

Demographics 

Housing 
According to the 2005 Municipal Census, there were 154 residences in the neighbourhood.  Approximately nine out of ten (91%) of the residences were single-family dwellings, with all but one of the remaining fourteen residences being duplexes, triplexes or quadruplexes.

Surrounding neighbourhoods

See also 
 Edmonton Federation of Community Leagues

References

External links 
 Brintnell Neighbourhood Profile

Neighbourhoods in Edmonton